The Dinagat Islands creation plebiscite was a plebiscite on the creation of the Province of Dinagat Islands from Surigao del Norte province in the Philippines. The plebiscite was held on December 2, 2006, and the results were announced on December 5, 2006.

Referendum question
The Dinagat Islands creation plebiscite was supervised and officiated by the COMELEC pursuant to Resolution No. 7743.

The question of the said plebiscite was:

DO YOU APPROVE OF THE CREATION OF THE PROVINCE OF DINAGAT ISLANDS INTO A DISTINCT AND INDEPENDENT PROVINCE COMPRISING THE MUNICIPALITIES OF BASILISA, CAGDIANAO, DINAGAT, LIBJO (ALBOR), LORETO, SAN JOSE AND TUBAJON IN THE PROVINCE OF SURIGAO DEL NORTE, PURSUANT TO REPUBLIC ACT NO. 9355

Results
The seven towns in Dinagat Island, five towns overwhelmingly voted for provincehood, with San Jose, the headquarters of the Philippine Benevolent Missionaries Association, having the highest turnout at 91.9%. Across the Dinagat Sound in Siargao, the "no" votes prevailed, but only 38% of registered voters turned out. In the Mindanao mainland, the no votes also prevailed, with also a low turnout. In the provincial capital of Surigao City, majority of the 44% who turned out were against provincehood.

San Jose was chosen as the capital of the new province.

Notes

2006 referendums
2006 in the Philippines
Provincial plebiscites in the Philippines
2006 elections in the Philippines
History of Dinagat Islands
Presidency of Gloria Macapagal Arroyo
Administrative division referendums